Béatrice Picard,  (born July 3, 1929 in Montreal, Quebec) is a Canadian actress whose career spans over six decades. She became known for her role as Angelina Desmarais in one of the first French Canadian "télé-roman" series called "Le survenant" in the early days of French-speaking television.  She then went on to a prolific career in televised comedies such as "Cré Basil" and "Symphorien". She also played in numerous theatre productions, summer plays, and films. Most recently, she is well known as the Quebec French voice of Marge Simpson in The Simpsons.

Picard received the title of "Miss Radio, Télévision et Cinéma Monde" in 1958.  She was a nominee in the 2008 Genie Awards for Best Lead Actress in My Aunt Aline (Ma tante Aline) in which she plays the title character.

Picard became a Member of the Order of Canada in 1988 and, in 2012, she was made an Officer of the National Order of Quebec.

References

External links 
 

1929 births
Living people
Actresses from Montreal
Canadian film actresses
Canadian television actresses
Canadian voice actresses
Officers of the National Order of Quebec